During 1974/75 season Juventus competed in Serie A, Coppa Italia and UEFA Cup.

Summary 

Carlo Parola returned to the team after 12 years  along with new arrivals Damiani and Scirea. Anastasi became the new captain after the retirement of Sandro Salvadore. A reinforced Juventus clinched its 16th league against runners-up Napoli.

Squad 

(captain)

Competitions

Serie A

League table

Matches

Coppa Italia

First round

Secondo round

UEFA Cup

Round of 32

Second round

Eightfinals

Quarterfinals

Semifinals

Statistics

Goalscorers
 

21 goals
 Pietro Anastasi

16 goals
 Oscar Damiani

13 goals
  José Altafini

10 goals
 Roberto Bettega

7 goals
 Franco Causio
 Fernando Viola

6 goals
 Fabio Capello

4 goals
 Antonello Cuccureddu

2 goals
 Gaetano Scirea

1 goal
 Claudio Gentile

References

Juventus F.C. seasons
Juventus
Italian football championship-winning seasons